Men's Greco-Roman 59 kg competition at the 2015 European Games in Baku, Azerbaijan, took place on 13 June at the Heydar Aliyev Arena.

Schedule
All times are Azerbaijan Standard Time (UTC+04:00)

Results 
Legend
F — Won by fall

Final

Top half

Bottom half

Repechage

References

External links